Martina Chirico (born 31 December 1987) is an Italian field hockey player for the Italian national team.

She participated at the 2018 Women's Hockey World Cup.

References

1987 births
Living people
Italian female field hockey players
Female field hockey goalkeepers